Hydroxystilbamidine is a fluorescent dye that emits different frequencies of light when bound to DNA and RNA. It is used as a retrograde tracer for outlining neurons, and as a histochemical stain.

References 

Amidines